Eugenia fulva is a species of plant in the family Myrtaceae. It is endemic to Sri Lanka.

References

Endemic flora of Sri Lanka
fulva
Vulnerable plants
Taxonomy articles created by Polbot